The bright crevice-skink (Egernia richardi) is a species of large skink, a lizard in the family Scincidae. The species is native to South Australia and Western Australia.

References

Skinks of Australia
Egernia
Reptiles described in 1869
Taxa named by Wilhelm Peters